Pacific University (formally known as "Pacific Academy Of Higher Education And Research University" (PAHER) is a private university in Udaipur, Rajasthan, India. It was established in 2010 by the PAHER Society. In April 2014 it was granted provisional membership by the Association of Indian Universities. Recently the university has been granted UGC approval for its operations u/s 22 and 2f of UGC act 1956.

Constituent Institutes 
The university is made up of constituent institutes that operate undergraduate, postgraduate and doctoral level programmes. The institutes include:

 Pacific Dental College 
 Pacific Institute of Technology 
 Pacific Institute of Management 
 Pacific College of Pharmacy 
 Pacific College of Physical Education 
 Pacific Institute of Hotel Management 
 Pacific Institute of Computer Application
 Pacific Polytechnic College 
 Pacific College of Basic and Applied Sciences
 Pacific Institute of Business Studies
 Pacific College of Social Sciences & Humanities
 Pacific Institute of Fire and Safety Management
 Pacific School of Law
 Pacific Institute of Fashion Technology

Pacific Dental College 
The college and Hospital are spread over a 1.3 lakh sq.ft. area that accommodates the administration offices, nine dental departments, four lecture theatres (120 seats per theatre) and a library. The nine departments are equipped with separate under-graduate and post-graduate sections. There is a separate section on the campus having an area of 25,000 sq.ft. for the Department of Basic Sciences. The campus also includes hostels for students, with separate buildings for undergraduate and graduate students.

Pacific Institute of Technology 
The institute offers graduate and postgraduate programs in various branches of engineering.

Pacific Institute of Management 
The institute was established in the year 1997. It was the 1st private business school established in Udaipur.

Pacific College of Pharmacy 
The college offers undergraduate and postgraduate programmes in addition to doctoral programme in various branches of pharmaceutical sciences.

Pacific Institute of Hotel Management 
The institute was established on 30 June 2008 and more than 300 students have graduated since that time. The institute offers courses at under-graduate, post–graduate and research levels.

Pacific Institute of Computer Application  
The institute offers undergraduate, graduate and doctoral degrees in computer application.

Publications
The university has three monthly periodicals, Pacific Business Review International, Pacific Hospitality Review and Pacific Update. A half yearly publication, "Unnati - The Business Journal", is in addition to numerous books and monographs.

See also
List of private universities in India

References

External links 
 

Private universities in India
Universities in Udaipur
Educational institutions established in 2010
2010 establishments in Rajasthan